An annular solar eclipse will occur on Saturday, October 3, 2043. A solar eclipse occurs when the Moon passes between Earth and the Sun, thereby totally or partly obscuring the image of the Sun for a viewer on Earth. An annular solar eclipse occurs when the Moon's apparent diameter is smaller than the Sun's, blocking most of the Sun's light and causing the Sun to look like an annulus (ring). An annular eclipse appears as a partial eclipse over a region of the Earth thousands of kilometres wide.

Images 
Animated path

Related eclipses

Solar eclipses of 2040–2043

Metonic cycle

References

External links 
 http://eclipse.gsfc.nasa.gov/SEplot/SEplot2001/SE2043Oct03A.GIF

2043 10 3
2043 in science
2043 10 3
2043 10 3